Philosophy of Love: A Partial Summing-Up is a 2009, book by the American philosopher Irving Singer, in which the author summarizes and expands upon the themes of his earlier three-volume works The Nature of Love (1984–1987) and Meaning in Life (1992–1996). The book, which has been described as an "intellectual biography" by its author, received positive reviews.

Summary

Singer summarizes his ideas about the philosophy of love.

Publication history
Philosophy of Love: A Partial Summing-Up was first published by MIT Press in 2009, with a foreword being written by Alan Soble.

Reception
Philosophy of Love: A Partial Summing-Up received positive reviews from the philosopher Leslie Armour in Library Journal, Erica Lucast Stonestreet in Notre Dame Philosophical Reviews, Michael Strawser in Dialogue: Canadian Philosophical Review, and from Publishers Weekly. The book was also reviewed by R. White in Choice: Current Reviews for Academic Libraries.

Armour described the book as "an account of a life devoted to the idea of love and the love of ideas", and wrote that it summarizes Singer's previous work, including his philosophical trilogies The Nature of Love and Meaning in Life, "with relaxed charm." Stonestreet observed that the book deals with the same themes as Singer's previous works, such as The Nature of Love. She wrote that it resembled a conversation in structure, and that it "lacks an overarching thesis and may for this reason be disappointing to someone who is looking for a systematic introduction to the philosophy of love", but credited Singer with being able to talk "graciously and thoughtfully about things that matter." She compared Singer's views to those of the philosopher Harry Frankfurt, in that "both believe that love involves bestowing value on the beloved". Strawser described the book as "the kind of book one wants to read by an eminent philosopher who has devoted his philosophical career to the study of love" and "an ideal opening text for a course on the philosophy of love". He credited Singer with providing an "accessible historical overview of the subject". Publishers Weekly described the book as "fairly interesting" and a summation of Singer's work, suggesting that it could serve as an introduction to it. It also wrote that it can serve as "a stand-alone survey of", or a model for understanding, the philosophy of love.

The philosopher Alan Soble wrote that Philosophy of Love: A Partial Summing-Up "is as much an intellectual biography as it is an exploration of love and sex", and observed that it "summarizes, explains, and elaborates" themes in Singer's The Nature of Love. He recommended it to "potential students of the philosophy of love and sex".

Bibliography
Books

 
 

Journals

  
  
  
  

Online articles

References

2009 non-fiction books
American non-fiction books
Books about the philosophy of love
Books about the philosophy of sexuality
Books by Irving Singer
Contemporary philosophical literature
English-language books
MIT Press books